The term Xdrive may refer to:

 BMW xDrive, an all-wheel-drive system that powers the BMW X1, X3, X5 and the X6, also available in certain 2 series, 3 Series, 4 series, 5 Series, 6 series, 7 series and MINI models.
 Xdrive, was a service offered by AOL that allowed users to back up their files over the Internet.